Foliated Jaguar, also known as Scroll Ahau Jaguar, (fl. 2nd/3rd century) was ajaw of the Maya city-state of Tikal.

Notes

Footnotes

References

Rulers of Tikal
2nd century in the Maya civilization
3rd century in the Maya civilization
2nd-century monarchs
3rd-century monarchs in North America